Ortege Jenkins (born February 1, 1978) is a former Canadian football quarterback in the Canadian Football League (CFL). He played for the BC Lions. He played college football at Arizona. He signed with the Baltimore Ravens as an undrafted free agent in 2001 but was released before the season.

Jenkins also played one season with the Arizona Wildcats basketball team.

References

1978 births
Living people
American football quarterbacks
Canadian football quarterbacks
Arizona Wildcats football players
Arizona Wildcats men's basketball players
BC Lions players
American men's basketball players